Dragan Načevski (born 27 January 1980) is a Macedonian retired football striker.

Clubs
1998–2004: FK Vardar
2004–2005: FK Madžari Solidarnost
2005–2008: Ergotelis FC
2008–2009: Kerkyra FC
2009: FK Baku
2009–2011: Ilioupoli F.C.
2011–2012: FK Metalurg Skopje
2012–2015: FK Teteks
2016–2017: Akademija Pandev

International career
He made his senior debut for Macedonia in a February 2001 friendly match against the Czech Republic and has earned a total of 14 caps, scoring 1 goal. His final international was an October 2002 European Championship qualification match against Turkey.

References

External links
Macedonian Football 

1980 births
Living people
Footballers from Skopje
Association football wingers
Macedonian footballers
North Macedonia international footballers
FK Vardar players
FK Madžari Solidarnost players
Ergotelis F.C. players
A.O. Kerkyra players
FC Baku players
Ilioupoli F.C. players
FK Metalurg Skopje players
FK Teteks players
Akademija Pandev players
Macedonian First Football League players
Football League (Greece) players
Azerbaijan Premier League players
Macedonian Second Football League players
Macedonian expatriate footballers
Expatriate footballers in Greece
Macedonian expatriate sportspeople in Greece
Expatriate footballers in Azerbaijan
Macedonian expatriate sportspeople in Azerbaijan